Abhishek Varman is an Indian film director and screenwriter. His directorial debut was the romantic drama 2 States (2014). followed by the ensemble period romantic drama Kalank (2019).

Filmography

References

External links

Living people
Hindi-language film directors
Place of birth missing (living people)
Year of birth missing (living people)
Indian screenwriters
Filmfare Awards winners